¡Quilombo! is the first studio album by the jazz band Steroid Maximus. It was released in 1991 by Big Cat Records. An edited version of "Fighteous" is the theme song of The Venture Bros. cartoon.

Track listing

Personnel 
Lin Culbertson – instruments on "Big Hedda Meets Little Napoleon" and "The Smother Brother"
Lucy Hamilton – instruments on "Life in the Greenhouse Effect"
Michel Langevin – instruments on "No Joy in Pudville"
Hahn Rowe – instruments on "The Smother Brother"
J. G. Thirlwell – instruments, arrangement, production, engineering, mixing, illustrations
Raymond Watts – instruments on "Big Hedda Meets Little Napoleon"

References

External links 
 
 
 Quilombo at foetus.org

1991 debut albums
Steroid Maximus albums
Big Cat Records albums